The fencing competition at the 1963 Mediterranean Games was held in Naples, Italy.

Unlike the first three editions of the Mediterranean Games, there were no team events this time.

Medalists

Medal table

References
1963 Mediterranean Games report at the International Committee of Mediterranean Games (CIJM) website
List of Olympians who won medals at the Mediterranean Games at Olympedia.org

M
Sports at the 1963 Mediterranean Games
1963
International fencing competitions hosted by Italy